The Heart of Things is an electric jazz fusion album released by guitarist John McLaughlin on Verve in 1997. Musicians include saxophonist Gary Thomas, keyboardist Jim Beard, bassist Matthew Garrison and drummer Dennis Chambers. All compositions were by McLaughlin, who also produced the album.

The album was recorded & mixed at the Officine Mechaniche studio in Milan, Italy, with engineers Paolo Iafelice and Celeste Frigo. Mixing engineers were Max Costa and Frigo.

Track listing
All tracks composed by John McLaughlin
 "Acid Jazz" (8:19)
 "Seven Sisters" (10:17)
 "Mr. D.C." (7:07)
 "Fallen Angels" (9:29)
 "Healing Hands" (7:36)
 "When Love is Far Away" (4:34)

Personnel
 John McLaughlin - electric, acoustic and MIDI guitars
 Gary Thomas - tenor and soprano saxophones, flute
 Jim Beard - synthesizers, acoustic piano
 Matthew Garrison - bass guitar, fretless bass guitar
 Jean-Paul Celea - double bass on "Acid Jazz"
 Dennis Chambers - drums
 Victor Williams - percussion

Chart performance

References

1997 albums
John McLaughlin (musician) albums
Verve Records albums